Borghallet is a gently-sloping plain of about , lying north of Borg Mountain in Queen Maud Land. It was mapped by Norwegian cartographers from surveys and from air photos by Norwegian–British–Swedish Antarctic Expedition (1949–52) and named "Borghallet" (the castle slope).

References
 

Plains of Queen Maud Land
Princess Martha Coast